The Battle of Charlestown was a small engagement between Confederate cavalry forces under Brig. Gen. John D. Imboden and the Union forces under Col. Benjamin L. Simpson on October 18, 1863, at Charles Town, West Virginia, as part of the Bristoe and Mine Run Campaigns, resulting in a Confederate victory.

Background
As the Confederate Army of Northern Virginia and the Union Army of the Potomac dueled it out in central Virginia during the Bristoe campaign, General Robert E. Lee dispatched cavalry under Brig. Gen. John Imboden to raid in the Shenandoah Valley and attack the vulnerable Union garrison at Charlestown, West Virginia, in an effort to draw Union forces away from his front. By October 17, Imboden's force had reached Berryville, where they skirmished with a company of the 1st New York Cavalry before driving them back to Charles Town. The presence of the Confederates was reported to Benjamin Simpson, commander of the Charles Town garrison. The inexperienced Simpson, having been mustered into service only 17 days earlier, dismissed recommendations to fall back on the much more strongly defended Harpers Ferry, believing Charles Town was not the target of the Confederate raid.

Battle
At dawn on the 18th, Union pickets south of Charles Town were driven back by Imboden's advance. Simpson's 9th Maryland Infantry, numbering some 375 men, took up position in the Jefferson County Courthouse (in which John Brown was tried and hanged) and ordered the cavalry, consisting of one company each of the Loudoun Rangers and 6th Michigan Cavalry, to "take care of themselves". Upon entering town, Imboden sent a flag of truce to negotiate surrender, to which Simpson refused. The cavalry, seeing the hopelessness of the situation, decided to fight their way out and unite with the Harpers Ferry garrison. On the northeast outskirts of town, the Union cavalry encountered the 18th Virginia Cavalry and 62nd Virginia Mounted Infantry, who unleashed a volley at the column, sending several troopers and their horses to the ground. Those troopers who were still mounted broke left around their felled comrades and serendipitously rode into the Confederate right, which was proved to be its weak spot. The Union cavalry cut its way out, taking heavy losses: 17 captured, 2 killed and several wounded and nearly every horse shot, several killed.

Meanwhile, back in Charles Town, Imboden brought up his artillery, and again demanded the garrison's surrender, which was rebuked for a second time, whereupon Imboden began to shell the town. Under the artillery fire, Simpson was forced to abandon the courthouse and marched his men to a field northwest of town, not far from the earlier cavalry engagement. Imboden massed his forces in a woods facing the field and unleashed a deadly volley. After several minutes and only a few shots fired in return, Simpson finally surrendered his force, now totaling some 365 men.

The artillery fire had not gone unnoticed in nearby Harpers Ferry; the 17th Indiana battery, Cole's Maryland Cavalry, and the remainder of the Loudoun Rangers and 6th Michigan, totaling 300 men in all, were dispatched to reinforce the besieged garrison. Within 15 minutes they had engaged Imboden's force and a fierce firefight ensued that lasted the entirety of the afternoon. The reinforcements, however, were not strong enough to drive off Imboden and liberate the prisoners.

At around 5 p.m. the 34th Massachusetts Infantry, 400 strong, arrived, having been marched 18 miles from their camp at Berryville to the sound of the artillery fire. As the sun set, the Bay Staters attacked Imboden, who with the cover of darkness elected to withdraw while still in possession of his prisoners and plunder from the town.

Aftermath
Imboden successfully attacked and defeated the Union garrison at Charles Town, exposing the weakness of Union forces in the Shenandoah Valley, taking only light losses. While his raid was successful, it had little overall impact on the fall campaigns, which ended shortly thereafter as the two armies went into winter quarters. For the Union's part, at considerable loss, they saved Charles Town from being sacked and burned and turned back Imboden's raid, which if had been allowed to continue may have had a larger strategic impact on the campaign in central Virginia.

References
 Goodheart, Briscoe, History of the Independent Loudoun Rangers: U.S. Cav. (Scouts) 1862-1865. McGill and Wallace; Washington, D.C., 1896.

Mine Run Campaign
Battles of the Eastern Theater of the American Civil War
Confederate victories of the American Civil War
Jefferson County, West Virginia in the American Civil War
Conflicts in 1863
1863 in West Virginia
Battles of the American Civil War in West Virginia
October 1863 events